Adhi Vinayaka (also known as Nara Mukha Vinayaka) is a form of the Hindu deity Ganesha (Vinayaka), which portrays Ganesha with a human head, prior to being decapitated by his father, Shiva. This specific form of Ganesha is rarely worshipped, with only few dedicated shrines, such as the one near Koothanur, Tamil Nadu. The word aadi or aadhi (आदि) means the 'first', and aadi-vinaayaka = "Vinayak in his first form", when he had a human head.

Etymology
This form's most common name, Adhi Vinayaka, derives from the word adhi, literally meaning "primordial" or "ancient". The secondary name Nara Mukha Vinayaka derives from the words nara ("human") and mukha ("face"). "Vinayaka" is a common name for the deity Ganesha.

Iconography
The Adhi Vinayaka phase of Ganesha was prior to the events of being decapitated by Shiva and obtaining the elephant or gaja head.  In this phase, Ganesha resembles his brothers Ayyappan and Murugan.

References

Forms of Ganesha